Barnstorf is a Samtgemeinde ("collective municipality") in the district of Diepholz, in Lower Saxony, Germany.
Its seat is in the village Barnstorf.

The Samtgemeinde Barnstorf consists of the following municipalities:

 Barnstorf
 Drebber 
 Drentwede 
 Eydelstedt

References